Maxime Kerstholt (born 24 February 1996) is a Dutch field hockey player, currently playing for Pinoké in the Dutch field hockey league.

Kerstholt made her debut for the Netherlands national team on the 23rd of January 2017 in a friendly match against Spain.  She won the gold medal at the 2018 Champions Trophy in Changzhou, China.

References

1996 births
Living people
Dutch female field hockey players
Female field hockey forwards
Field hockey players at the 2014 Summer Youth Olympics
21st-century Dutch women